Semyon Ivanovich Kanatchikov (Russian: Семён Иванович Канатчиков; 13 April 1879 – 19 October 1940) was a Russian revolutionary, Soviet politician, journalist, literary critic and writer.

Biography 
Kanatchikov was born in to a peasant family and became a worker from a young age. He was a member of the League of Struggle for the Emancipation of the Working Class and joined the Russian Social Democratic Labour Party after its founding. From 1903, he was a member of its Bolshevik faction.

In 1905, he was a member of the Moscow, then St. Petersburg party committees. Then he worked in Yekaterinburg and Nizhny Tagil.

A Bolshevik delegate with a decisive vote from the Ural organization of the 4th (Unification) Congress of the RSDLP (1906), represented the Nizhny Tagil organization, Egorov in the minutes of the congress and supported Vladimir Lenin and his platform. From 1910 to 1916 he was in prison and exile in the Irkutsk province.

In 1917 he was a member of the Novonikolaevsky (Novosibirsk) and Tomsk committees of the RSDLP (b), a member of the Novonikolaev council. In 1918, chairman of the Tomsk military revolutionary headquarters, deputy chairman of the provincial executive committee, then a member of the Perm provincial executive committee and head of the provincial department of public education.

From 1919 he worked in Moscow. He was member of the Board of the People's Commissariat of Internal Affairs, a member of the Small Council of People's Commissars, one of the organizers of the Sverdlov Communist University.

He served Deputy Chairman of the Council of People's Commissars of the Tatar ASSR in 1920–1921.

From 1921 to 1924 he was the rector of the Zinoviev Communist University in Petrograd. In 1925 he headed the State Institute of Journalism (GIJ).

In 1924 he was the head of the press department of the Central Committee of the RCP(b) and in 1925-1926 he was the head of the Istpart department of the Central Committee of the All-Union Communist Party (b). In 1926-1928 he was a TASS correspondent in Czechoslovakia.

A supporter of Grigory Zinoviev, from 1925 to 1927, Kanatchikov was a member of the Leningrad and the United Opposition. He then broke with the opposition and engaged in self criticism.

He was a professor of the Faculty of Soviet Law at Moscow State University (1925–1926) where read a course on the history of the party. 

From 1928 he engaged in literary work. Kanatchikov served as an ditor of the Krasnaya Nov magazine, and editor of the Proletarian Revolution journal, in 1929-1930, the responsible (chief) editor of the Literaturnaya Gazeta, and then editor-in-chief of GIHL.

Kanatchikov was arrested by the NKVD in 1936 and sentenced to 8 years in work camps.

From April 1938 he was included in the list of persons whose works were subject to unconditional withdrawal from libraries. 

Kanatchikov died in a Gulag in 1940. According to other sources, he was shot in 1937.

Further reading 
A Radical Worker in Tsarist Russia: The Autobiography of Semen Ivanovich Kanatchikov. Stanford University Press, 1986

References

1879 births
1940 deaths
Soviet writers
Revolutionaries from the Russian Empire
Russian Social Democratic Labour Party members
Old Bolsheviks
Soviet journalists
Soviet literary critics
Soviet editors
Academic staff of Moscow State University
Great Purge victims from Russia
Soviet rehabilitations
People who died in the Gulag